Mr. Rossi's Dreams (in Italian I sogni del signor Rossi) is a 1977 traditionally animated Italian feature film directed by Bruno Bozzetto. Is the second feature film of Mr. Rossi.

Plot
After a long and tiring week of work, Mr. Rossi returns home to his home where the dog Gastone awaits him, who after a week of solitude wants to go out, run and go to the cinema. Yes, because Gastone's heroes are those of the screen, television and literature and it is in these characters that the dog imagines his master. We will then see a Rossitarzan, a Rossi-astronaut, Rossi-Holmes, Rossi-Zorro, Rossi-scientist, Rossi-Lancelot, Rossi-Aladino and Rossi-Hollywood actor. But once the dreams are over, for Rossi there will be a sad return to the mediocrity of his life.

Cast

Additional Voices
Original: Carlo Bonomi
English: Arthur Grosser (Driver, Genie), Neil Shee (Narrator, Hippo, Tiger, Reporter, Dog, Pedro, Producer), Vlasta Vrána (Merlin, Bulldog, Genie, Servant)

English voice actor
The dubbing was realized in the 1980s.

DVD

See also
List of animated feature-length films
Mr. Rossi

External links
Official website

1977 films
Italian animated films
1970s Italian-language films
Films directed by Bruno Bozzetto
1977 animated films
1970s Italian films